Imelcana camelina is a species of moth of the family Tortricidae which is endemic to Venezuela.

The ground colour of the forewings is pale brownish cream, suffused and strigulated with brownish, especially in the distal half of the wing. The markings are brownish, with brown proximal edges. The hindwings are cream, tinged yellowish in the distal third.

Etymology
The species name refers to the presence of a hump-like lobe at the mid-costa and is derived from Latin camelinus (meaning similar to a camel).

References

External links

Moths described in 2006
Endemic fauna of Venezuela
Tortricidae of South America
Euliini
Taxa named by Józef Razowski